Gene Loves Jezebel are a British rock band formed in the early 1980s by identical twin brothers Jay (born John) and Michael Aston. Gene Loves Jezebel's best-known songs include "Heartache", "Desire (Come and Get It)" (1986), "The Motion of Love" (1987), "Jealous" (1990), and "Break the Chain" (1993), as well as alternative club hits "Bruises" (1983), "Influenza (Relapse)" (1984), and "The Cow" (1985). "The Motion of Love" was the band's most successful UK single.

The name of the band is a reference to rock musician Gene Vincent and his song "Jezebel".

As the result of a rift between the Aston brothers in 1997 and ongoing legal issues, there are currently two incarnations of the band.

Early years: 1980–1989
Originally called Slavaryan, Gene Loves Jezebel was formed in 1980 with the Aston brothers, guitarist Ian Hudson, bassist Stephen Davis, and drummer Steve Snowy Evans. The Astons grew up in Cornelly, and later Porthcawl, in Wales, and moved to London in 1981. With a new home, and shortly afterwards, the new name, the trio with bassist Julianne Regan and drummer James Chater (later replaced by John Murphy (the Associates) and then Richard Hawkins) played several live shows and were signed by Situation Two. Gene Loves Jezebel underwent numerous lineup changes between 1981 and 1985. In May 1982, Situation Two released Gene Loves Jezebel's demo and single, "Shaving My Neck". Keyboardist Jean-Marc Lederman was added and then Regan exited within a year to form All About Eve. This left Ian Hudson briefly playing bass and Albie DeLuca as the guitar player until Stephen Marshall joined.

In 1983, the band released two more singles, "Screaming (For Emmalene)" and "Bruises", and then their first album, Promise, which peaked at number 8 in the UK Indie Chart. In 1984, the group recorded a John Peel radio session for the BBC and toured the UK with fellow Welsh artist John Cale.

The band's second album, Immigrant, was released in mid-1985. However, at the start of a long American tour for Immigrant, founding member Ian Hudson left and was replaced by former Chelsea and Generation X guitarist James Stevenson (who later also played rhythm guitar on tour with the Cult).

During 1986, the group moved to Situation Two's parent company, Beggar's Banquet Records, and distribution rights in the U.S. were given to Geffen Records. The subsequent promotion increased pop-chart success for the group. The single "Sweetest Thing" briefly hit the top 75 in the U.K., and the album Discover reached number 32 in the UK Albums Chart. At this time, the group also found heavy rotation on college and counterculture radio stations across America. The band had slowly turned their attention to dance music. The singles "Desire" and "Heartache" reached #6 and #72, respectively, on Los Angeles' new wave station, KROQ-FM. Later that year, former Spear of Destiny and Thompson Twins member Chris Bell became the band's fifth drummer.

Gene Loves Jezebel's fourth album, The House of Dolls, was released in 1987 and yielded the singles "20 Killer Hurts" and "The Motion of Love". "The Motion of Love" was the band's biggest UK hit, reaching number 56. The third single from The House of Dolls, "Suspicion", marked the band's first appearance on the US Billboard Hot 100.

Split and brief reunion: 1990–1997
While Michael Aston went solo, the rest of the band continued as Gene Loves Jezebel and recorded two albums, Kiss of Life (1990) and Heavenly Bodies (1992). The band's highest-charting American single emerged in August 1990 when "Jealous", the major single from Kiss of Life, reached #68 on the Billboard Hot 100 and #1 on the Billboard Modern Rock chart. Because of the collapse of the band's American label, Savage Records, Jay Aston said he felt the band was "forced into hiatus". 
But in 1993, the brothers reformed the band with a new lineup; Francois Perez replaced James Stevenson and drummer Robert Adam was retained.

While Jay Aston performed occasional acoustic shows under his own name, Michael Aston played with members of Scenic, then formed a new band called the Immigrants (renamed Edith Grove) and later released a primarily acoustic solo album, Why Me, Why This, Why Now. The brothers began working together again that same year and recorded two songs with Stevenson, Bell, and Rizzo for a compilation album, The Best Of, released in September 1995. Jay Aston also recorded a solo album, Unpopular Songs, produced by Stevenson.

The brothers reconciled in the mid-1990s, wrote some new songs together, and shared a house in Los Angeles. They initially used Michael Aston's band from the Why Me album era. In 1997, the band embarked on the Pre-Raphaelite Brothers tour, in which Gene Loves Jezebel material and songs from the brothers' solo careers would be performed.

Two Genes Loving Jezebel: 1997–present

After the Pre-Raphaelite Brothers tour, Jay Aston refused to work with his brother unless Stevenson and Rizzo were brought back. Michael Aston agreed, and the album VII was recorded in England. A reunion tour was undertaken in the U.S. during which a rift developed between the brothers. Michael Aston, who missed the final dates of the tour, launched his own band, also called Gene Loves Jezebel, with musicians from the Pre-Raphaelite tour. His vocals were removed from the VII album, which was released without any contribution from him. Later, the full album with Michael's vocals included was released as The Doghouse Sessions. In October 1997, Jay Aston, Rizzo, and Stevenson sued Michael Aston over rights to the name Gene Loves Jezebel and, after a protracted court battle, eventually dropped the lawsuit.

Michael Aston leads the US version of the band and has toured both the US and the UK, supporting releases such as Love Lies Bleeding (1999), Giving Up the Ghost (2001) and Exploding Girls (2003). Jay Aston leads the UK version of the band, also featuring James Stevenson and Pete Rizzo, and has toured both the US and the UK extensively as well to support releases such as Accept No Substitute (2002), The Thornfield Sessions (2003), The Anthology, Vols. 1-2 (2006) and Dance Underwater (2017).

On 15 February 2008, a lawsuit was filed by Michael Aston in California's Central District Court, against "Chris Bell, James Stevenson, Jay Aston, John Aston, Libertalia Entertainment and others" for trademark infringement. In a posting on their Myspace page on 25 September 2009, Jay Aston's Gene Loves Jezebel announced that an agreement had been reached with Michael Aston regarding the use of the name Gene Loves Jezebel: Jay Aston's band is now known as "Gene Loves Jezebel" in the UK and "Jay Aston's Gene Loves Jezebel" within the US; Michael Aston's band is now known as "Gene Loves Jezebel" in the US and "Michael Aston's Gene Loves Jezebel" in the UK. The settlement agreement was posted on Michael Aston's Gene Loves Jezebel website.

Jay Aston, along with Julianne Regan, contributed vocals on a cover of the Rolling Stones' "Moonlight Mile" that appeared on the 2010 album Small Distortions by the Belgian music project La Femme Verte (assembled by ex-Kid Montana member Jean-Marc Lederman).

In 2011, Michael Aston contributed vocals to a new version of "Desire", titled "Desire (Come and Get It)", by guitarist and producer Gabe Treiyer's electronic music project Electronic Fair, which became number one on the Electronic Dance Music (EDM) Chart in Argentina.

On 16 November 2011, Jay Aston and James Stevenson appeared on stage at the Brixton Academy in London with the Smashing Pumpkins to perform the song "Stephen" from the Immigrant album. Alternative indie folk rock band the Mountain Goats reference the performance and this Wikipedia page in the song "Abandoned Flesh" from their 2017 album Goths.

In December 2016, Jay Aston's Gene Loves Jezebel announced that they were recording a new album via a Pledge Music campaign. The album, entitled Dance Underwater, was completed in April 2017 and was released on 30 June 2017 via Westworld Recordings/Plastichead.

In September 2018, Jay Aston, James Stevenson, and Peter Rizzo were named as defendants in a lawsuit brought by Michael Aston for infringement of his trademark at the end of Jay Aston's Gene Loves Jezebel's first US tour in ten years. Jay Aston's band argued that they had complied with the agreement with Michael Aston to the best of their ability. At the hearing on 7 January 2019 in Santa Ana, California, the judge found in favour of the defendants on all of the five counts that Michael Aston had brought and ordered him to pay the defendants' legal fees.

Discography

Albums

Singles

¹ Michael Aston's Gene Loves Jezebel
² Jay Aston's Gene Loves Jezebel

References

External links
(Jay Aston's) Gene Loves Jezebel site
(Michael Aston's) Gene Loves Jezebel official site
Jay Aston official site
Gene Loves Jezebel official Myspace
James Stevenson official site

[ Gene Loves Jezebel] at AllMusic

Musical groups established in 1980
Welsh rock music groups
Welsh gothic rock groups
Welsh post-punk music groups
Welsh hard rock musical groups
Welsh alternative rock groups
Welsh new wave musical groups
Situation Two artists
Beggars Banquet Records artists
Geffen Records artists
Sibling musical groups